Longshan District is a district of Liaoyuan, Jilin, China.

Administrative Divisions
Subdistricts:
Dongji Subdistrict, Xining Subdistrict, Nankang Subdistrict, Beishou Subdistrict, Zhanqian Subdistrict, Xiangyang Subdistrict, Fuzhen Subdistrict, Xinxing Subdistrict

The only town is Shoushan, and the only township is Gongnong Township

References

External links

County-level divisions of Jilin